Jonava railway bridge (lit. Jonavos geležinkelio tiltas, Jonavos geležinis tiltas) is a railway bridge over the Neris in Jonava (Jonava district municipality), the ninth largest city in Lithuania with a population of ca 35,000.

History 
The old railway bridge in Jonava was built in 1914, designed by Petras Vileišis (1851-1926).
In the fall of 1937 taught Lithuanian Armed Forces, designed by Major Juozas Vitkus active reinforced concrete bunkers to defend the bridge. So they were the first in Lithuania, designed and built by local engineers. During the Second World War the bridge was destroyed. A new bridge was built 20 meters further downstream towards Kaunas. One of the old piers of the former railway bridge was left in the Neris River, on which it was planned in 2008 to build a sculpture of the Earth goddess Žemyna.

Gallery

References 
 Industrial Monuments in Lithuania // Eligijus Juvencijus Morkūnas. Technikos paminklai Lietuvoje. Kultūros paveldo centro leidykla „Savastis". Vilnius, 2000.
 Bridges of Jonava // Darius Klibavičius. Jonavos tiltai. In: Jonavos rajono laikraštis „Naujienos“. – 2000 m. liepos 11 d., p. 4.

External links 
 Senoji geležinkelio tilto atrama Neries upėje
 Photo in the night
 Lietuvos kariuomenės slėptuvės

Bridges in Jonava
Jonava
Bridges completed in 1914